Tour du Maroc is the most important road bicycle race in the African state of Morocco. The editions 1957–1993 were reserved to amateurs. Since 2006, it is organized as a 2.2 event on the UCI Africa Tour.

Winners

External links
 2008 Tour du Maroc results
 Tour du Maroc prize list and last results

UCI Africa Tour races
Cycle races in Morocco
Recurring sporting events established in 1937
1937 establishments in Morocco
Spring (season) events in Morocco